Operation Snoopy was an operation launched by Rhodesia in response to Air Rhodesia Flight 825 being shot down by the communist backed insurgent group the ZIPRA. The Operation took place in Mozambique where many of the ZANLA's camps were located, particularly in the area in and around Chimoio.

Background
After the Viscount passenger plane was shot down by the communist backed insurgents many Rhodesians clamoured for a massive retaliatory strike against terrorist targets in Zambia, since this was where a large number of the insurgents were based. However, the first external target hit by the Rhodesian Security Forces following the Viscount shootdown was the prominent cluster of ZANLA bases around Chimoio in Mozambique.

The Operation
The Rhodesians destroyed the ZANLA's camps in and around the town of Chimoio through a combination of ground operations and air strikes by the Rhodesian Air Force. In total the security forces attacked and destroyed twenty-five insurgent camps. The camps were spread over a 33km2 area, which was approximately 70km from the Rhodesian border.

During the operation Mozambique sent armoured vehicles to ZANLA's aid in the form of nine Soviet-made T-54 tanks and four Russian BTR-152 armoured personnel carriers. However, the Mozambicans were easily sent into a rout by the elite units of the Rhodesian Security Forces, who managed to destroy one of the Mozambicans' armoured vehicles, and kill an unknown number of Mozambicans. 

Hawker Hunter fighter-bombers from the RhAF destroyed another two Mozambican armoured personnel carriers. According to official Rhodesian figures, "several hundred" guerrillas killed during Operation Snoopy, while the security forces lost only two troopers. One of whom was SAS trooper Steve Donnelly who was accidentally killed by a friendly air strike involving a Golf Bomb.

References

Bibliography

Snoopy